Pedro Filipe Gomes Soares (born 15 February 1979) is a Portuguese mathematician and politician of the Left Bloc.

Born in Castelo de Paiva, Aveiro District, he graduated in Applied Mathematics from the University of Porto, and has a master's degree in remote sensing. In 2001, aged 22, he ran for a city council seat, and four years later he was second on his party's electoral list in the district for the legislative elections.

In 2009, Soares became the first Left Bloc politician elected to the Assembly of the Republic by the Aveiro District, and was re-elected in 2011. On 6 December 2012, he was voted the party's parliamentary leader. In the 2015 elections, Soares was elected to the Assembly for a third time, this time by the Lisbon District.

References

External links
Profile at Left Bloc parliamentary party website 

1979 births
Living people
People from Castelo de Paiva
21st-century Portuguese mathematicians
University of Porto alumni
Left Bloc politicians
Members of the Assembly of the Republic (Portugal)